Krasnaya Gora is a rural locality (a village) in Ilyinskoye Rural Settlement, Kolchuginsky District, Vladimir Oblast, Russia. The population was 48 as of 2010. There are 4 streets.

Geography 
Krasnaya Gora is located on the Peksha River, 22 km north of Kolchugino (the district's administrative centre) by road. Bolshepetrovskoye is the nearest rural locality.

References 

Rural localities in Kolchuginsky District